Temeš is a village and municipality in Prievidza District in the Trenčín Region of western Slovakia.

History
In historical records the village was first mentioned in 1332.

Geography
The municipality lies at an altitude of 520 metres and covers an area of 4.274 km². It has a population of about 290 people.

External links
http://www.statistics.sk/mosmis/eng/run.html

Villages and municipalities in Prievidza District